Three ships of the German and Austro-Hungarian navies have been named SMS Basilisk:

, a Prussian gunboat that served during the wars of German unification
, a German armored gunboat
, an Austro-Hungarian minelayer that later served as the Romanian Aurora

Ship names